The 2022 Road to the Kentucky Derby is a series of races through which horses qualified for the 2022 Kentucky Derby, which was held on May 7. The field for the Derby is limited to 20 horses, with up to four 'also eligibles' in case of a late withdrawal from the field. There are three separate paths for horses to take to qualify for the Derby: the main Road consisting of races in North America (plus one in Dubai), the Japan Road consisting of four races in Japan, and the European road consisting of seven races in England, Ireland and France. The top four finishers in the specified races receive points, with higher points awarded in the major prep races in March and April. Earnings in non-restricted stakes races act as a tie breaker.

For 2022, the main Road to the Kentucky Derby resembled the 2021 Road to the Kentucky Derby, consisting of 37 races, one more event than in 2021, with 21 races for the Kentucky Derby Prep Season and 16 races for the Kentucky Derby Championship Season with the following changes:

 The inaugural Gun Runner Stakes at the Fair Grounds was added as part of the Prep season
 Qualification points were not awarded to any horse trained by any individual who was suspended from racing in the 2022 Kentucky Derby or any trainer directly or indirectly employed, supervised, or advised by a suspended trainer. This rule was introduced in response to Churchill Down's suspension of trainer Bob Baffert following a positive drug test by one of his horses in the 2021 Kentucky Derby.

Standings 

The following table shows the points earned in the eligible races for the main series. As none of the offers on the Japan Road or European Road were accepted, all twenty positions in the Derby starting gate will qualify via the main series. The rankings are from the April 25 update of the Kentucky Derby leaderboard, updated for the May 1 announcement that Early Voting would bypass the race.

Legend:

 

ƒ – Filly

Prep season 

Note: 1st=10 points; 2nd=4 points; 3rd=2 points; 4th=1 point (except the Breeders' Cup Juvenile: 1st=20 points; 2nd=8 points; 3rd=4 points; 4th=2 points)

Championship series events

First leg of series 
Note: 1st=50 points; 2nd=20 points; 3rd=10 points; 4th=5 points

Second leg of series 
Theses races are the major preps for the Kentucky Derby, and are thus weighted more heavily. Note: 1st=100 points; 2nd=40 points; 3rd=20 points; 4th=10 points

"Wild Card" events 
Note: 1st=20 points; 2nd=8 points; 3rd=4 points; 4th=2 points

Japan Road to the Kentucky Derby 

The Japan Road to the Kentucky Derby is intended to provide a place in the Derby starting gate to the top finisher in the series. If the connections of that horse decline the invitation, their place is offered to the second-place finisher and so on through the top four finishers. As none of the offers were accepted, this place in the starting gate reverts to the horses on the main road to the Derby.

Note:
Cattleya Sho:  1st=10 points; 2nd=4 points; 3rd=2 points; 4th=1 point
Zen-Nippon Nisai Yushun:  1st=20 points; 2nd=8 points; 3rd=4 points; 4th=2 points
Hyacinth: 1st=30 points; 2nd=12 points; 3rd=6 points; 4th=3 points
Fukuyru : 1st=40 points; 2nd=16 points; 3rd=8 points; 4th=4 points

ƒ Filly

Qualification Table
The top four horses (colored brown within the standings) are eligible to participate in the Kentucky Derby provided the horse is nominated.

Notes:
 brown highlight – qualified
 grey highlight – did not qualify

European Road to the Kentucky Derby 

The European Road to the Kentucky Derby is designed on a similar basis to the Japan Road and is intended to provide a place in the Derby starting gate to the top finisher in the series. If the connections of that horse decline the invitation, their place is offered to the second-place finisher and so on. As none of the offers were accepted, this place in the starting gate reverts to the horses on the main road to the Derby.

The series consists of seven races – four run on the turf in late 2021 when the horses are age two, plus three races run on a synthetic surface in early 2022.

Note:
 the four races in 2021 for two-year-olds: 1st=10 points; 2nd=4 points; 3rd=2 points; 4th=1 point
 the first two races in 2022: 1st=20 points; 2nd=8 points; 3rd=4 points; 4th=2 points
 The Cardinal Condition Stakes: 1st=30 points; 2nd=12 points; 3rd=6 points; 4th=3 points

Qualification Table
The top four horses (colored brown within the standings) are eligible to participate in the Kentucky Derby provided the horse is nominated.

Notes:
 brown highlight – qualified
 grey highlight – did not qualify

See also 
2022 Road to the Kentucky Oaks

Notes

References 

Road to the Kentucky Derby, 2022
Road to the Kentucky Derby
Road to the Kentucky Derby
Road to the Kentucky Derby